Diae El Jardi (13 October 2000) is a Moroccan professional tennis player.

Career
She has played for Morocco in the Fed Cup where she has a win–loss record of 2–7.

On the junior tour, El Jardi has a career-high ranking of 59, achieved on 15 January 2018.

ITF Junior Circuit finals

Singles: 6 (2–4)

Doubles: 11 (9–2)

External links
 
 
 

2000 births
Living people
Moroccan female tennis players
People from Meknes
21st-century Moroccan women
Rice Owls women's tennis players